Jürgen Maurer (born 30 January 1967) is an Austrian actor. He was a regular cast member of Austrian-coproduced crime drama Tatort, and appeared in society drama .

He is known to English speaking audiences for his role as Detective Oskar Rheinhardt in the British-Austrian series Vienna Blood.

Early life and education 
Maurer was born in Klagenfurt am Wörthersee. He graduated from the BRG Klagenfurt-Viktring in 1985 and then studied until 1988 at the Academy of Fine Arts Vienna, where he settled.

From 1997 until 2012, Maurer was a performer for the Burgtheater.

Filmography

Film

Television Film

Television

Theatre

References

External links
 

Living people
Austrian male television actors
Austrian male stage actors
Austrian male film actors
1967 births